The field hockey tournament at the 1967 Pan American Games was the first edition of the field hockey event at the Pan American Games. It took place in Winnipeg, Canada from 24 July to 4 August 1967.

Argentina won the first edition of the field hockey event at the Pan American Games by defeating Trinidad and Tobago 5–0 in the final. The United States took the bronze medal by defeating the hosts Canada 1–0.

Results

Round robin

First to fourth place classification

Semi-finals

Bronze medal match

Gold medal match

Final standings

References
 Pan American Games field hockey medalists on HickokSports

1967
1967 Pan American Games
1967 Pan American Games
Pan American Games